Lakhmir Wala (sometimes spelled Lakhmeerwala or Lakhmirwala) is a village in the Mansa district of Indian Punjab.

Geography 

Chachohar, Kot Dharmu, Bhamme Khurd, Akkan Wali and Khiali Chehlan Wali are the nearby villages.

History 
Lakhmirwala is the site of archaeological remains belonging to the Harappan Civilization. The Archaeological Survey of India has also conducted excavations at nearby Dhalewan that revealed Harappan Civilization finds.

Culture 

Punjabi is the mother tongue as well as the official language here. The Jatt clan of the village includes, Jagal, Chahal, Brar Sidhu Bhathal and Sandhu  BHATTI.

Religion 

By religion, the village is predominated by the Sikhs, the follower of Sikhism with Hindu and Muslim minorities.

Demographics 

According to the 2001 census, the village has the total population of 1,584 with 280 households, 861 males and 723 females.

Education 

There is a government primary school on the way to Chachohar.

Notes

References 

Villages in Mansa district, India